Elmer is a small lunar impact crater that is located to the south of Mare Smythii, near the eastern limb of the Moon. This crater is seen at a highly oblique angle from Earth, and the visibility is affected by libration. Elmer lies southwest of the crater Kreiken, and east-southeast of the larger Dale. This is a circular, bowl-shaped crater with an interior floor that occupies about half the total diameter.

The crater is named after Charles Wesley Elmer, an amateur astronomer and the co-founder of PerkinElmer.

Citations

References

 
 
 
 
 
 
 
 
 
 
 
 

Impact craters on the Moon